Nicolas Gob (born 29 October 1982) is a Belgian actor who has worked extensively in television, both in serials and films made for TV. He has also appeared in several feature films.

His work in television serials includes 35 episodes in the role of Kévin Laporte in Les Bleus and 43 episodes as Jean Marchetti in Un village français as well as the role of Yann in Chefs. He also starred in the 2014 fantasy film Beauty and the Beast.

Filmography

References

External links

1982 births
Living people
Belgian male film actors
Belgian male television actors
Male actors from Brussels
21st-century Belgian male actors